Nemiscam, also known as Nemiskam, and originally known as Bingham, is an unincorporated community within the County of Forty Mile No. 8 in southern Alberta, Canada. The community is about 5 km east of Foremost and west of Etzikom, Alberta on Highway 61 and is administered by the County of Forty Mile No. 8.

History

Originally Nemiskam started off as a small community named Bingham located 1 km southwest of the new town site. Due to the bypassing of the railway the citizens of Bingham decided to settle in Nemiskam, some even bringing their homes, and businesses with them. During the community's prosperous years the community had a community hall, four grain elevators, a school, and a service station.

Beginning in the 1960s Nemiskam's population was at a total of 54 residents, a few years after in 1966 the town's population went down to just 17 people. Today many of the original buildings and residents have  once again picked up and moved to find better way of life, most moving to Foremost some even bringing their homes with them. In the early 1990s, the dying community would suffer another loss – its four grain elevators – leaving the community in a ghost town state with only 6 buildings left.

Name origin
For many years Nemiskam or Nemiscam has had many disputes over the different ways of spelling the community's name. People and map companies of today spell the name with a “C” but many older folk like to spell it with a “K” as it was originally spelled on the towns long gone grain elevators, and community hall, Nemiskam with a “K” is native for “between two valleys”.

See also 
 List of communities in Alberta
 List of ghost towns in Alberta

References 

Ghost towns in Alberta
Localities in the County of Forty Mile No. 8